Bartolomeo Bonascia was an Italian painter of the Renaissance period. He was known to be active since 1468 and died in 1527. He painted a Pietà , dated 1485, in the Estense Gallery in Modena.

References

15th-century Italian painters
Italian male painters
Painters from Modena
Italian Renaissance painters
1527 deaths
Year of birth unknown